John Andrews may refer to:

Sports
 John Andrews (baseball) (born 1949), American baseball pitcher
 John Andrews (cyclist) (1934–2000), British cyclist
 John Andrews (footballer, born 1950), English footballer
 John Andrews (footballer, born 1978), Irish footballer and manager
 John Andrews (tennis) (born 1952), tennis player from the United States
 John "Tiny" Andrews (1951–2015), American football defensive tackle
 John Andrews (American football) (born 1948), American football tight end

Politicians
 John Andrews (Colorado politician), state senator, 1998–2005
 Jack Andrews (John Lawson Ormrod Andrews, 1903–1986), Northern Irish politician
 J. M. Andrews (John Miller Andrews, 1871–1956), Northern Irish politician
 John T. Andrews (politician) (1803–1894), U.S. Representative from New York
 John Andrews (New Zealand politician) (1892–1983), Mayor of Lower Hutt, New Zealand
 John Andrews (Maine politician), state representative (2018–present)

Military
 John Andrews (Medal of Honor) (1821–?), U.S. Navy sailor awarded the Medal of Honor for actions during the Korean Expedition
 John Oliver Andrews (1896–1989), English World War I flying ace

Writers
 John Andrews (historical writer) (1736–1809), historical writer and pamphleteer
 John Andrews (poet), English poet
 John Arthur Andrews (1865–1903), Australian anarchist journalist
 John Williams Andrews (1898–1975), journalist, public relations professional and author
 John Andrews (writer) (born 1936), crime (as John Malcolm) and antiques writer
 John G. Andrews, pen name of Emma Huntington Nason (1845–1921), American writer and composer

Religious figures
 J. N. Andrews (John Nevins Andrews, 1829–1883), Seventh-day Adventist leader
 John Andrews (priest) (1746–1813), Colonial American clergyman

Others
 John Andrews (architect) (1933–2022), architect for the CN Tower in Toronto and Gund Hall at Harvard University
 John Bertram Andrews (1880–1943), American economist
 John T. Andrews (geologist) (born 1937), professor of geological and atmospheric and oceanic sciences
 John Andrews, conductor The Brook Street Band

See also
 John Andrew (disambiguation)